Papatoitoi railway station was a station on the North Island Main Trunk in New Zealand.

References

Defunct railway stations in New Zealand